, also known as Tales from Moominvalley, is a Dutch-Japanese anime television series produced by Telecable Benelux B.V. and animated by Telescreen Japan. Based on the Moomin novels and comic strips by the Finnish illustrator and author Tove Jansson and her brother Lars Jansson, it was the third anime adaptation of the property and the first to receive distribution in other countries worldwide. Moomin first aired on TV Tokyo from April 12, 1990, to October 3, 1991. The series had also been dubbed into English and aired on CBBC in United Kingdom during the same year.

Moomin takes place in the peaceful rural land of Moominvalley, where a young Moomin along with his parents Moominpappa and Moominmamma live in Moominhouse. The series follows the many adventures of Moomin and family, together with their friends, around Moominvalley and sometimes outside of it. Most of the stories involve discovering magical objects and creatures, adventures in different locations or dealing with everyday situations. While many episodes are faithful or at least loosely based on the novels and comic strips, the series has its own consistent continuity.
 
The series helped fuel the "Moomin boom" of the 1990s, including an obsession with Moomin plush toys in Japan. After great success of the series, a sequel called  was made. The sequel aired in several countries outside of Japan, where it was considered another season of Moomin, although it was never dubbed into English. The original series also spawned a theatrical prequel film Comet in Moominland which is based on the second novel of the same name and video games releases. Moomin second aired on TV Tokyo from October 10, 1991, to March 26, 1992.

The series was dubbed into many languages (including, but not limited to, the aforementioned English, Swedish, Finnish, Norwegian, and Danish) and aired worldwide. In addition, a Northern Sami dub was made by NRK Sámi Radio and aired on NRK 1 in Norway and SVT1 in Sweden alongside the aforementioned Norwegian and Swedish dubs.

Plot

The series begins with the arrival of spring in Moominvalley. Moomin, along with Little My, Moominpappa and Moominmamma wake up in Moominhouse, while Snufkin also comes back from his south travel on the first day of spring. The first eight episodes create a coherent storyline that is based on the third novel, Finn Family Moomintroll. During the story, Moomin and his friends find out the magical silk hat, that turns out to belong to the Hobgoblin. He later gets his hat back from the Moomin family. The Moomins later find a wrecked boat, fix it and travel to a lonely island which is full of Hattifatteners. Next, two small creatures called Thingumy and Bob with a large suitcase arrive to the Moominhouse, and they are followed by the Groke. After the Moomins manage to evict the Groke from their way by giving her Moomin's seashell, it turns out that Thingumy and Bob are keeping the large "King's Ruby" in their suitcase. After Thingummy and Bob return Moominmamma's missing handbag, the Moomins celebrate the event with a large junket, where suddenly the Hobgoblin also arrives. Finally the problem of the King's Ruby's ownership is solved with the Hobgoblin's magic.

Moomin takes place between a three-year period of time. Moomin and his family or friends manage to take part in two winter periods through the series, although the Moomins are normally supposed to fall into hibernation. Through the series, Snork, the Snork Maiden's inventor brother, designs and creates two flying ships of different type; the first is destroyed due sabotage and the second one gets finished at the end of the series. Before the second winter period, the Moomins and their friends also get to know Alicia and her grandmother, who is a witch. She teaches Alicia to become a real witch and has a negative opinion about the Moomins and their nice nature. As the series goes on, the witch however begins to appreciate them. At the end of the series, Snork decides to go on a journey with his finished flying ship while Alicia and her grandmother also leave the Moominvalley for the third winter period. The series concludes when the winter arrives, the Moomins fall into hibernation and Snufkin travels to the south once again.

Production
Moomin is the third anime adaptation based on the novels and comic strips. Before the production, author Tove Jansson was already displeased with the previous Moomin anime adaptation from 1969 due to how unfaithful the series' characters and stories were to her original source material. Because of this, both of the first Moomin and New Moomin from 1972 were never distributed or aired outside Japan. Since 1981, Finnish animation and commercial producer Dennis Livson began to beg the rights from Tove and Lars Jansson to make another animated adaptation. Eventually, Livson managed to win both of them over after they saw his previous produced animated series Alfred J Kwak, and rights for another series were obtained. A year later in Tokyo, Livson showed a small preview of the anime series for both Tove and Lars Jansson. According to Livson, Tove commented it by saying "Dom lever ju" ("They are really alive!").

Unlike previous two anime adaptations, Moomin was co-production of Dutch company Telecable Benelux B.V. (later re-titled as Telescreen since 1998 until the acquisition to brand management & media company m4e in 2008) and Japanese animation studios Telescreen Japan Inc. and Visual 80. Hiroshi Saitō and Masayuki Kojima were the series' main directors while Akira Miyazaki did the screenplay for the first 12 and many later episodes. Tove and Lars Jansson were also involved with the screenplay by doing certain changes in scripts.

In Japan, this work "Moomin" is known as "regular broadcast even in the Gulf War". When the Gulf War (Operation Desert Storm) broke out on January 17, 1991, while other TV stations in Tokyo switched to emergency broadcasting, only TV Tokyo broadcast "Moomin" as usual and attracted a lot of attention.

Differences from the books
The series includes plotlines taken from following Moomin books: Finn Family Moomintroll (eight episodes), Moominland Midwinter (three episodes), Moominsummer Madness (three episodes), The Exploits of Moominpappa (three episodes), Moominpappa at Sea (two episodes) and several short stories from the collection Tales from Moominvalley (five episodes in total). Roughly twenty episodes in the original series and dozen more in the sequel series are based on stories taken from Tove and Lars Jansson's Moomin comic strips. The series does have differences from the books and comic strips, more strongly than European stop-motion series The Moomins that aired between 1977 and 1982, but not as much as the previous two anime adaptations. Certain events and characters from the books and comic strips are missing to fit the series' own continuity or for reasons unknown. Many new plotlines and some new characters have been added, especially in the later episodes. Some notable differences include:
Moomintroll is called simply "Moomin", except in the first episode in the Japanese version, where the narrator introduces him as "Moomintroll".
Little My appears in the series from the beginning, but appears only in later volumes in the books.
Lady of the Cold looks very different from the description in the books.
In the books the Moomins exchange the King's Ruby for the Hobgoblin's top hat and the Hobgoblin later arrives, to collect the King's Ruby, with a new hat. In the series however, Hobgoblin gets his top hat back in the second episode and in the seventh episode the Moomins instead exchange the King's Ruby for a heart-shaped sea-shell Snorkmaiden gave Moomin.
Also the wishes are different. In the series, Snorkmaiden wishes for eyes like the Wooden Lady, Moomin wishes them back to normal after she ends up hating them, and with the third wish Thingumy and Bob wish for a ruby just like the Hobgoblin's. In the book, Mamma wishes for Moomin to not miss Snufkin being gone, and Moomin wishes for some of the party's food to go to Snufkin. 
A Fillyjonk raises Moominpappa in the orphanage in the series, while in the books it's a Hemulen who raises him.
Snorkmaiden and Sniff who disappear occasionally in the book series have bigger roles in the TV series and they appear quite often throughout the series.　
Snufkin takes a friendly attitude towards people who are not in the Moomin family. He doesn't smoke a pipe in the series.
Snork appears regularly and he's portrayed as a scientist and inventor whereas in the books he's a very minor character who mainly tries to solve varying problems with systematic approach. Snork's fixation with flying is not based on the books.
Alicia and her grandmother (the witch) are characters who were invented for the series, they did not exist in the books or comic strips.

Cast and characters

In Sweden, the cast was exclusively made up of Finland-Swedes. Generally Finland-Swedish actors are always cast as the Moomins in Swedish productions and localizations because Tove Jansson herself was a Finland-Swede. The Japanese, Italian, Finnish and Swedish dubs used a female narrator to give the impression that the show was narrated by Jansson herself.

William Roberts replaced Peter Whitman as Moominpappa after Episode 47, due to Whitman's death.

Episodes

The first anime series consists of 78 episodes, although only 76 episodes have been aired in certain countries. The series was first aired in Japan on TV Tokyo on April 12, 1990. The last episode aired in Japan on October 3, 1991.

After its first run in Japan, many other television channels have re-aired the first series. The series was distributed to many countries worldwide. In Tove Jansson's home country Finland, the series first aired on Finnish Broadcasting Company's YLE TV1 on September 1, 1991, and a Swedish dub first aired three days later. After the first run, the series has been moved to YLE TV2 and has been rebroadcasting along with the sequel series in almost every year, either with the Finnish or Swedish dub. In 2017, presentations rights of the series in Finland was moved from Yle to commercial channel MTV Oy. The series received a new HD-remaster, and a new Finnish translation and dubbing was recorded, due to copyright reasons. The new Finnish translation was based largely on the CBBC English version.

During the early 1990s, the first anime series has also been dubbed into British English for Children's BBC (later renamed as CBBC) in the United Kingdom under the title Moomin. The series was distributed by Maverick Entertainment, while the dubbing was recorded at Cardiff's Eco Studios. The full voice cast includes Susan Sheridan, Toni Barry, Pat Starr, Peter Whitman, John Chancer, David Graham, Garrick Hagon, Jeff Harding and Stacey Jefferson. Sheridan's daughter Emily Stride also provided the English voice of Too-Ticky in some episodes. The series has never aired in the United States with the exception being Hawaii, where the series has been called The Tales of Moomin Valley and aired on television station K-5. Despite the different opening and ending themes, Hawaii airings featured the British dub from Children's BBC.

Between 2019 and 2020, all 78 episodes of the first series were uploaded to YouTube by official Moomin channel under the new title Adventures from Moominvalley. The British dub was used again with new, high definition remastered prints.

Delightful Moomin Family: Adventure Diary
After the high success of the first anime series in Japan, the second anime series titled  was made. TV Tokyo aired it in Japan from October 10, 1991, to March 26, 1992. Consisting 26 more episodes, continued from the first period, it will be from episodes 79 to 104. The sequel series does not feature any adaptations of Jansson's books but some of its episodes were based on Moomin comic strips.

Outside Japan only a few countries have aired Tanoshii Mūmin Ikka: Bōken Nikki and it has usually been featured as a new season of Moomin. The sequel series has been aired for example in Tove Jansson's home country Finland (but only in Finnish dub), Israel, Norway and Poland. The sequel series has never been dubbed to English and it hasn't been aired on CBBC. Producer Dennis Livson was later highly critical towards the sequel series and stated that "we had nothing left to mine from by way of Tove’s own stories."

Theme songs
 Opening themes
 (ep: 1 – 52)
 Singer : Emiko Shiratori
 Lyricist : Emiko Shiratori
 Composer : Sumio Shiratori
 Arranger : Masatsugu Watanabe
 (ep : 53 – 78)
 Singer : the Pompin Team (Minami Takayama, Mika Kanai, Akio Ōtsuka, Takehito Koyasu, Rei Sakuma, Ryūsei Nakao)
 Lyricist : Kiriko Seriguchi
 Composer : Sumio Shiratori
 Arranger : Masatsugu Watanabe
 (ep : 79 – 104)
 Singer : Ado Mizumori, Tairon Hashimoto
 Lyricist : Emiko Shiratori, Futaba Ōno
 Composer : Sumio Shiratori
 Arranger : Masatsugu Watanabe

 Ending themes
 (ep : 1 – 52)
 Singer : Emiko Shiratori
 Lyricist : Emiko Shiratori
 Composer : Sumio Shiratori
 Arranger : Masatsugu Watanabe
 (ep : 53 – 104)
 Singer : Emiko Shiratori
 Lyricist : Emiko Shiratori
 Composer : Emiko Shiratori
 Arranger : Masatsugu Watanabe

Related media

Films

After the broadcast of the sequel series, a theatrical animated film Comet in Moominland was first released as a triple-feature with two unrelated shorter films on August 8, 1992, in Japan. Based on Tove Jansson's second Moomin novel of the same name, the animated film works as a prequel to the 1990 anime series. Comet in Moominland has been dubbed to several European languages, and was later dubbed into English with a separate cast (which was included on the German DVD release of the film). A modernized version of the film was planned to be released in 2020 to coincide with the 75th anniversary of the Moomin franchise, but was delayed indefinitely due to the COVID-19 pandemic

After Tove Jansson's death, the series' producer Dennis Livson was planning to make a second film based on Moominpappa at Sea but Tove Jansson's niece Sophia Jansson didn't give him permission for it.

Home releases

In Japan, the series was released both as individual DVD volumes and box sets by Victor Entertainment. A Blu-ray Disc Box Set was also released on December 21, 2012.

During the 1990s, a selected number of episodes of the English dub were released on VHS, and in 2005 a R2 DVD of the first five episodes, entitled Moomin Mania was released by Maverick Entertainment, but was later discontinued. As of 2009, four DVD volumes has been released in the UK by STAX Entertainment, while Telescreen has released eight volumes and two box sets for the American market. These boxsets only go up to Episode 52 however, they do not include episodes 53–78. At this time there is currently no home release of English versions of these episodes. However they, along with the other 52 English episodes have all been officially uploaded to YouTube by official Moomin channel.

In the Nordic countries, the series was released by Svensk Filmindustri and by Finnkino and VL-Media in Finland. In 2017, VL-Media started publishing on DVD new remastered and re-dubbed version of the series.

Video games
There are several video games based on directly the 1990 anime series. Most of them excluding Moomin's Tale, remain exclusive releases in Japan.

Soundtracks
The music score of Moomin is composed by Sumio Shiratori and the original theme song as well as other singing heard in the series is performed by his wife Emiko Shiratori. From episodes 53–78, the opening theme is  performed by "Ponpin-tai ~Moomin-dani no Nakamatachi~" group and the closing theme is  sung by Emiko Shiratori. Outside Japan, the international version had been aired with different opening and ending theme songs, which are composed by Dutch composer Pierre Kartner. The Nepalese dub of the series has both themes sung by Nepalese singer Deepesh Kishor Bhattarai.

There are four soundtrack albums and several single releases of both the first 1990 and sequel series, all of which are exclusively released in Japan. The third album  from 1992 is basic soundtrack album that includes the opening, ending, and background music from the series. The fourth album  was released on 2014 along with same tracks from previous albums with addition of new music tracks. All albums and singles in Japan are released by King Records.

References

External links
Moomin at Tokyo MX's official website (Japanese)
Moomin at Cartoon Network's official website (Japanese)
Moomin at Telescreen

Moomin at ClassicKidsTV.co.uk

1990 anime television series debuts
Anime based on novels
Moomin television series
Television shows based on children's books
Television shows based on comic strips
Television shows based on comics
TV Tokyo original programming
Yle original programming
BBC children's television shows